The Minister for Migration (Swedish: Migrationsminister) is a cabinet minister within the Swedish Government. The cabinet minister is appointed by the Prime Minister of Sweden.

List of officeholders

Ministry history 
The office of Minister for Migration has been under several different ministries since its founding in 1996.

Government ministers of Sweden